God Loves Fiasco is the first full-length album by the band Fiasco.

Track listing
 "Hot House" - 4:02
 "Fed Up" - 1:31
 "Vertical Litter" - 2:16
 "Sir Gentleman" - 1:16
 "Jonathan's Voice Cracks" - 0:05
 "Wild Goose Chase Rag" - 3:23
 "Stargaze" - 7:35
 "Stop That" - 1:21
 "Nothing To Lose" - 3:15
 "0157:H7" - Spy Song" - 2:20
 "Rod Ferrell" - 4:27
 "Disappointment" - 5:49
 "Shot In My Sleep" - 3:55
 "TK-421" - 1:07
 "True Story" - The Aquarium" - 5:17
 "We Think You're Wrong" - 1:34
 "Execute Order 66" - 4:07
 "Red Delicious" - 3:30
 "Song For Ian" - 5:17
 "Jonathan Messes Up" - 0:09
 "You Never Know" - 2:46
 "Träume" - 4:04
 "Don't Mind The Killings" - 9:12

Personnel
Jonathan Edelstein - Guitar, vocals
Julian Bennett Holmes - drums
Lucian Buscemi - Bass, Vocals

References

2007 debut albums
Fiasco (band) albums